Sir Theagaraya College is located in Old Washermenpet, Chennai, Tamil Nadu, India. The college is affiliated to the University of Madras. Arts and Science courses offered include B.A. Historical Studies, B.A. Economics, B.Sc Chemistry, Physics, Botany, and Zoology, B.Com General, M.A. Historical Studies, M.A. Economics, M.Sc Zoology, Ph.D. Both full-time and part-time: Historical Studies, Economics and Zoology 
Self-Financing Courses (Shift-II) UG COURSES are B.C.A (Bachelor of Computer Application), B.B.A (Bachelor of Business Administration) B.Sc Computer Science, B.Com General, B.Com Computer Application, B.Com Accounting and Financing, and B. Com Corporate Secretaryship.PG Courses commences from the academic year 2019-2020 are M.Sc, Computer Science and M.Com(General).

References

External links
 

Educational institutions established in 1950
Arts and Science colleges in Chennai
1950 establishments in Madras State
Colleges affiliated to University of Madras